Sankt Leonhard (or St. Leonhard) may refer to the following places:

in Austria:
Bad Sankt Leonhard im Lavanttal, in Carinthia
Sankt Leonhard im Pitztal, in Tyrol 
Sankt Leonhard am Forst, in Lower Austria
Sankt Leonhard am Hornerwald, in Lower Austria
Sankt Leonhard bei Freistadt, in Upper Austria
St. Leonhard in Passeier, in Italy